was a railway station on the Kaikyo Line in Fukushima, Hokkaido, Japan, operated by Hokkaido Railway Company (JR Hokkaido). The station was underground and was located within the Seikan Tunnel under the Tsugaru Strait linking the main Japanese island of Honshu with the northern island of Hokkaido.

Overview

One of two stations located within the Seikan Tunnel, along with Tappi-Kaitei Station, it served as an emergency escape point, and this role has not changed after its closure as a passenger station. By segmenting the undersea tunnel, in the event of a fire or other disaster, the stations provide safety equivalent to that of a much shorter tunnel. The effectiveness of the escape shafts located at the emergency stations is enhanced by exhaust fans that suck up smoke, television cameras to route passengers to safety, thermal (infrared) fire alarm systems, and water spray nozzles.

Previously, the station contained a museum detailing the history and function of the tunnel and could be visited on special sightseeing tours. However, while Tappi-Kaitei remained as a museum until 2013, Yoshioka-Kaitei was closed to regular services on March 17, 2006 to make way for Hokkaido Shinkansen preparations.

A special 781 series Doraemon-themed train then started running on July 15, 2006 to the station, which staged a  exhibition. This service continued until August 27, 2006, when the station was shut down and used as storage space for Hokkaido Shinkansen building materials.

History 
The station opened on March 13, 1988, along with the Kaikyo Line. From March 17, 2006, regular services stopped calling at this station to make way for Hokkaido Shinkansen construction work, and on August 27, 2006, the special Doraemon-themed train also made its final stop at the station.

The station formally closed as of the end of March 14, 2014.

See also
 List of railway stations in Japan
 Arsenalna (Kyiv Metro), the deepest urban rapid transit station in the world

References

External links 
 "An undersea station tour guide"

Railway stations in Japan opened in 1988
Railway stations in Hokkaido Prefecture
Seikan Tunnel
Stations of Hokkaido Railway Company
Tsugaru-Kaikyō Line
Railway stations closed in 2014
Defunct railway stations in Japan
2014 disestablishments in Japan